Pequeños Gigantes (English title: Little Giants) is a Mexican reality talent show that premiered on Las Estrellas March 27, 2011. The talent show televises groups of talented children from various Hispanic countries including the United States (each group comprises four children) competing against each other to receive the highest ranking at the end of each program, and for the first place and the grand prize. Each group has one captain, one singer, and two dancers. Six judges give each child category a rating based from 1 to 10.

In December 2018, it was announced that auditions for the fourth season had begun.

Hosts and Judges

The first season premiered on March 27, 2011 hosted by Galilea Montijo, Jimena Gállego, And Yurem Rojas. The judges were Bianca Marroquín, María José, Manuel "Flaco" Ibáñez, Pierre Angelo, Noel Schajris and Raquel Ortega. For the second season, Schajris and Angelo didn’t return and saw Fanny Lú and Arath de la Torre as their replacements. In 2018, a third season was announced with Adrián Di Monte, Lupe Esparza, Nacho and Ariel Miramontes as the new judges joining three-season veterans Marroquín and Ibañez. Season four saw a reduction of judges from six to four. Miramontes was the only one returning from the previous season joined by Karol Sevilla, Verónica Castro and Miguel Bosé. For the fifth season, Miramontes returned once again, for his third season with María León, Bibi Gaytán and Juanpa Zurita. Montijo has served for all five season as host.

Seasons

Season 1 (2011)
Season one premiered on Las Estrellas on March 27, 2011 and concluded on July 24, 2011. On Univision the season premiere on June 19, 2011 and concluded on September 5, 2011. Galilea Montijo, Jimena Gállego, and Yurem Rojas are hosts for this season. The judges of this season are Bianca Marroquín, María José, Manuel "Flaco" Ibáñez, Raquel Ortega, Noel Schajris, and Pierre Angelo. In this season seven teams of four children compete for the grand prize of 2 million MXN pesos to be distributed among the four team members, a trophy, and the singer of the team would sing a song with Gloria Trevi.

The winning team of this season is Los Irresistibles consisting of Javier Ruíz, Miguel Angel Romero, Daryna González, and Jorge del Valle.

Season 2 (2012)
Season two premiered on Las Estrellas on April 15, 2012 and concluded on July 15, 2012. On Univision the season premiere on June 3, 2012 and concluded on September 2, 2012. Galilea Montijo and Jimena Gállego returned as hosts. Bianca Marroquín, María José, Manuel "Flaco" Ibáñez, and Raquel Ortega returned as judges. Fanny Lu and Arath de la Torre replaced Noel Schajris and Pierre Angelo as judges. In this season seven teams of four children compete for the grand prize of a trophy and 2 million MXN pesos to be distributed among the four team members.

The winning team of this season is Mega Estrellas consisting of Rogelio Cruz, Irlanda Valenzuela, Gretchen Rojas, and Max Kozelchick.

Season 3 (2018)
Season three premiered on February 25, 2018 and concluded on April 29, 2018. This is the first season to air simultaneously on Las Estrellas and Univision. Galilea Montijo and Jimena Gállego returned as the hosts. Bianca Marroquín and Manuel "Flaco" Ibáñez returned as judges. Lupe Esparza, Adrián Di Monte, Nacho, and Ariel Miramontes "Albertano" replaced María José,  Raquel Ortega, Fanny Lu, and Arath de la Torre as judges. In this season six teams of four children compete for the grand prize of 1 million MXN pesos to be distributed among the four team members.

The winning team of this season is Los Super Powers consisting of Natalia Gomez, Rodrigo Perez "Canelito", Jazlyn Quintero, and Aramis Ojeda.

Season 4 (2019)
Season four premiered on March 24, 2019, and concluded on May 26, 2019. On Univision the season concluded on 2 June 2019. Auditions were held in February 2019. Galilea Montijo returned as host. Bárbara Islas joined as co-host. The number of judges was reduced from six to four. Ariel Miramontes "Albertano" returned as judge. Verónica Castro, Miguel Bosé, and Karol Sevilla replaced Lupe Esparza, Adrián Di Monte, Nacho, Bianca Marroquín, and Manuel "Flaco" Ibáñez as judges. This is the first season to include extraordinary physical abilities as a talent and the child is called the "Quinto Elemento" (Fifth Element). In this season six teams of five children compete for the grand prize of 1,200,000 MXN pesos to be distributed among each other.

The winning team of this season is Giovani y los saca chispas consisting of Giovani Chávez, Rafael Salazar, Sara Alejos, Yamil Ibáñez, and Mariana Olvera.

Ratings

U.S. ratings

International versions of Pequeños Gigantes
 Currently airing franchise
 Franchise with an upcoming season
 Franchise whose status is unknown
 Franchise no longer in production

References

External links
Official website in Mexico
Official website in the United States

2010s Mexican television series
2011 Mexican television series debuts
Mexican reality television series
Las Estrellas original programming
Television series by Televisa
Spanish-language television shows